Judge Henry Jackson Wells (1823–1912) was a resident of Cambridge, Massachusetts, and he served as a Massachusetts Representative and a Massachusetts Senator in the Massachusetts legislature.

Biography
He married Maria A. Goodnow and their child is Henrietta Wells Livermore.

References

1823 births
1912 deaths
Massachusetts state senators
Members of the Massachusetts House of Representatives
19th-century American politicians